Pop Girl was a free-to-air children's television channel in the United Kingdom, owned by CSC Media Group (formerly Chart Show Channels), a company associated with the makers of The Chart Show, a television programme that had previously been on Channel 4 and ITV. It broadcast cartoons, live action and pop music videos on Sky and Freesat. Its target audience was 7 to 12-year-old girls.

Pop Girl originally broadcast from 6 am until 9 pm in order to share bandwidth with the now-defunct AnimeCentral, a general entertainment channel also owned and operated by CSC Media Group, which broadcast from 9pm until 6am. Subsequently, Pop Girl's broadcast hours were extended to match those of Kix and it broadcast from 6am until 11:30pm. This allowed the sharing arrangement with AnimeCentral to end, thus allowing the entertainment channel to broadcast 24 hours when it became Showcase TV (now 'True Entertainment').

Programming
Here are all the programmes Pop Girl broadcast prior to the dissolution of the channel.
15/Love
6teen
Angela Anaconda (2007-September 2010)
Bindi the Jungle Girl
Black Hole High
Blue Water High (2010-2014)
Braceface
Cake
Clue
Dance Revolution
Dance Studio
Even Stevens (2008-2013)
Family Biz
The Fairies
Flight 29 Down
Foreign Exchange
G2G
Girlstuff/Boystuff
H2O: Just Add Water (2010-2014)
High Flyers
Horseland
How to Be Indie
The Latest Buzz
Lazy Lucy
Life with Derek
Littlest Pet Shop (2012)
Lizzie McGuire
Lola & Virginia
Madeline (2009-2013)
Majority Rules!
Mary-Kate and Ashley in Action!
Mew Mew Power (2007-2011)
Missy Mila
Mortified
My Babysitter's a Vampire
My Dad the Rock Star
My Little Pony: Friendship Is Magic
Naturally, Sadie (2009-2012)
The Next Star
Outriders
Pippi Longstocking
Pearlie
Pop Party
Pretty Cure (September 2010-2012)
Really Me
Ruby Gloom
Sabrina: The Animated Series
Sabrina's Secret Life
Sabrina, the Teenage Witch
The Saddle Club (2007-2015)
Sally Bollywood
Saved by the Bell
Scout's Safari
Spotlight
Strawberry Shortcake
Strawberry Shortcake's Berry Bitty Adventures
The Sleepover Club (2009-2013)
Surprise! It's Edible Incredible!
Starla and the Jewel Riders
Totally Spies!
Trollz
Two of a Kind
Unfabulous (2007-2015)
What About Mimi?
What's Up Warthogs!
Winx Club
Z-Squad
Zoey 101

The showreel on CSC Media's PopGirl page included extracts from Really Me, Flight 29 Down, and How to Be Indie.

Little Miss Pop Girl
Since 12 May 2008, a new block was made called "Little Miss Pop Girl", which sees a slight change to the channel's content between 9am and 12pm every weekday during the school term. The block was aimed at younger girls and shows cartoons such as Lazy Lucy, Pippi Longstocking, Strawberry Shortcake or Horseland, including some programmes which are more commonly seen on Tiny Pop. The logo for the block was the regular Pop Girl logo with the words 'Little Miss' superimposed above. The block did not run at weekends or during school holidays.

Pop Girl +1
On 9 May 2008, the AGB Nielsen Media website announced that Pop Girl +1 would launch on Sky channel 629, on 9 June 2008. However, it was in fact launched a few days before that, on 4 June 2008, replacing CSC Media Group's first music time shift, Flaunt +1, after being on air just shy of four weeks.

On 22 July 2013, Kix received a spin-off channel, Kix Power, which replaced Pop Girl +1.

Closure
Pop Girl ceased to broadcast at 06:00 on 1 October 2015. The broadcast capacity was immediately replaced with transmission of a revived Kix +1 timeshift channel, though during the course of the day the positions of the channel on the Sky and Freesat guides were altered (so as to move the channel below Kix in the lineup; Pop Girl had been ahead of Kix on both platforms.)

It was indicated that some Pop Girl shows would move to other channels in the network: H2O: Just Add Water was the first to do so, moving across to POP.

Although Pop Girl ceased as a broadcast channel, the popgirl.tv website continued to exist, and continued offering programming, video clips, quizzes and games; a message on the site indicated that the website would later receive a relaunch as part of its migration to an online service. In addition, a PopGirl section of games, features and videos was made available on sister channel POP's website. It was later redirected to the Pop website.

See also
 CSC Media Group
 Kix
 Pop
 Tiny Pop

References

External links
Pop Girl Official Twitter

CSC Media Group
Children's television networks
Defunct television channels in the United Kingdom
Children's television channels in the United Kingdom
English-language television stations in the United Kingdom
Television channels and stations established in 2007
Television channels and stations disestablished in 2015
Television channels in the United Kingdom
Sony Pictures Television